Bucketty is a locality in the City of Cessnock local government area (LGA), in New South Wales, Australia. Bucketty is presumably the Aboriginal word for mountain spring.

Bucketty is situated on a ridge of ironstone hills separating Yengo National Park from the Central Coast.

Bucketty has no services and the nearest general stores are located in Laguna and Kulnura. The New South Wales Rural Fire Service maintains the Bucketty & District Rural Fire Brigade and the Fire Shed is the social centre of the town. When rural addressing was introduced, the numbering was based on the distance from Broke, and some of the streets were also given names.

Background 
Bucketty and the surrounding bushland contains some of the country's most significant Aboriginal sites, including Mt Yengo.  In the early 1800s pioneers settled in Murrays Run, and one of the most significant roads of the colony, the 220 km-long (136 mi) Great North Road between Sydney and Newcastle, was built using convict labour.

The current community of Bucketty (186 people) was only established in 1972.  It was in Bucketty that the Convict Trail Project was conceived – a heritage initiative that manages the restoration, maintenance and promotion of the convict-built road . The community is also involved in the Wombat Rescue Project which has attracted national attention and has an MoU with the NPWS to self-manage the Convict Wall site that is part of the Yengo National Park. This site is a focal point for community activities, such as the Concerts under the Stars and the annual Carols by Candlelight. The community has received several awards for its various activities and initiatives .

References

External links 
 Bucketty Book

City of Cessnock